Mullin is a surname of Irish origin. Notable people with the name include:

 Chris Mullin (b. 1963), American basketball player
 Chris Mullin (politician), British Labour Party Member of Parliament
 Emma Mullin (born 1985), Irish Ladies Gaelic footballer
 Gene Mullin (1927-2021), American politician
 George Mullin (baseball) (1880-1944), baseball pitcher 
 George Mullin (VC) (1892-1963), American recipient of the Victoria Cross during World War I
 Gerald T. Mullin (1900-1982), American businessman, lawyer, and politician
 Glenn Mullin, author
 Herbert Mullin, American serial killer
 Hugh P. Mullin, Philippine–American War Medal of Honor recipient
 Jack Mullin (1913-1999), American engineer
 John Mullin (disambiguation), several people
 Joseph Mullin (1811–1882), New York lawyer and politician
 Mabel Mullin (born 1882), club president
 Markwayne Mullin (born 1977), U.S. Senator for Oklahoma
 Mike Mullin (disambiguation), several people
 Oisín Mullin (born 2000), Irish footballer
 Paul Mullin (footballer, born 1974), English footballer
 Paul Mullin (footballer, born 1994), English footballer
 Willard Mullin (1902–1978) was an American sports cartoonist

See also
 Mullen, a surname
 Mullins (surname)

Surnames of Irish origin